Plum Lake may refer to:

Plum Lake, Wisconsin, a town
Plum Lake (Jackson County, Minnesota)
Plum Lake (South Dakota)
Plum Lakes, a group of lakes in Manitoba